Mission Point Light is a lighthouse located in the U.S. state of Michigan at the end of Old Mission Point, a peninsula jutting into Grand Traverse Bay  north of Traverse City. When it was built in 1870, it was an exact copy of the Mama Juda Light (now destroyed), which was built on the Detroit River in 1866.

The foundation is natural and emplaced. The wooden structure is painted white with black trim. The square tower is attached to a dwelling.

A fixed white Fifth Order Fresnel lens was installed. The building was only one and one half stories tall. Maintaining the dune and protecting it and the lighthouse from the deleterious effects of wave action has been a constant struggle.

For 67 years the light served to warn mariners about the shoals off the point. However, new techniques in offshore construction and the automation of lighthouse illumination made it possible to build a navigation aid on the shoal itself. The light ran on batteries. It had a 30-second dwell time between flashes, in order to conserve power.

Famously, the lighthouse stands a few hundred yards south of the 45th parallel north, halfway between the North Pole and the Equator. The lighthouse was deactivated in 1933 and purchased by the State of Michigan. There are a pair of signs that denote its location on the parallel, and it is one of 29 places (six are in Michigan) in the U.S.A. where such signs are known to exist.

Current status and activities
The lighthouse is located in Old Mission State Park, which is managed by Peninsula Township as Lighthouse Park,  at the northern end of M-37.

As reported in the Traverse City Record Eagle, in a unique program, the lighthouse society sought volunteers to work and live in the Mission Point Light during 2008. There is a fee, which will benefit the light.

In 2008, the building opened for the first time to the public (it will have a small museum), after serving for many years as the park manager's residence.

The area around the lighthouse attracts many cross country skiers. There is a boat launch there, which is favored by sea kayakers. The location is becoming increasingly popular, which has subjected it to environmental issues that are being addressed by Peninsula Township.

The Old Mission Peninsula is said to be a premier place to sea kayak. One gets close to shore, lighthouse, picnic grounds and parks. The bay offers a shelter from the prevailing westerly winds and from the Lake Michigan waves. Maps, rentals and guided tours are available.

Because of its form, surroundings and location, it is photogenic, having inspired photographs and illustrations, including drawings and needlepoint.

See also
Lighthouses in the United States

References

Bibliography

 Bibliography on Michigan lighthouses.
 Crompton, Samuel Willard & Michael J. Rhein, The Ultimate Book of Lighthouses (2002) ; .
 Hyde, Charles K., and Ann and John Mahan. The Northern Lights: Lighthouses of the Upper Great Lakes. Detroit: Wayne State University Press, 1995.  .
 Jones, Ray & Bruce Roberts, American Lighthouses (Globe Pequot, September 1, 1998, 1st Ed.) ; .
 Jones, Ray,The Lighthouse Encyclopedia, The Definitive Reference (Globe Pequot, January 1, 2004, 1st ed.) ; .
 Noble, Dennis, Lighthouses & Keepers: U. S. Lighthouse Service and Its Legacy (Annapolis: U. S. Naval Institute Press, 1997). ; .
 Oleszewski, Wes, Great Lakes Lighthouses, American and Canadian: A Comprehensive Directory/Guide to Great Lakes Lighthouses, (Gwinn, Michigan: Avery Color Studios, Inc., 1998) .
 Penrod, John, Lighthouses of Michigan, (Berrien Center, Michigan: Penrod/Hiawatha, 1998)  .
 Penrose, Laurie and Bill, A Traveler's Guide to 116 Michigan Lighthouses (Petoskey, Michigan: Friede Publications, 1999).  
 
 Putnam, George R., Lighthouses and Lightships of the United States, (Boston: Houghton Mifflin Co., 1933).
 United States Coast Guard, Aids to Navigation, (Washington, DC: U. S. Government Printing Office, 1945).
 
 
 Wagner, John L., Michigan Lighthouses: An Aerial Photographic Perspective, (East Lansing, Michigan: John L. Wagner, 1998)  .
 Wargin, Ed, Legends of Light: A Michigan Lighthouse Portfolio (Ann Arbor Media Group, 2006). .
 Wright, Larry and Wright, Patricia, Great Lakes Lighthouses Encyclopedia Hardback (Erin: Boston Mills Press, 2006) .

External links

 Mission Point Lighthouse - official site
 Aerial photos, Old Mission Point Light, marinas.com.
 Detroit News, Interactive map on Michigan lighthouses.

Lighthouses completed in 1870
Houses completed in 1870
Museums in Grand Traverse County, Michigan
Lighthouse museums in Michigan
1870 establishments in Michigan